The 446th Missile Squadron (446 MS) is an inactive United States Air Force unit.  It was last assigned to the 321st Missile Group, stationed at Grand Forks AFB, North Dakota

The 446 MS was equipped with the LGM-30G Minuteman III Intercontinental ballistic missile (ICBM), with a mission of nuclear deterrence.  With the end of the Cold War, the 446th was inactivated on 30 September 1998.

History

World War II

Activated in mid-1942 as a B-25 Mitchell medium bomber squadron, it was trained by the Third Air Force in the southeastern United States. It deployed to the Mediterranean Theater of Operations (MTO), and was assigned to the Twelfth Air Force in Algeria in early 1943. In North Africa, the squadron was engaged primarily in support and interdictory operations, bombing marshalling yards, rail lines, highways, bridges, viaducts, troop concentrations, gun emplacements, shipping, harbors and other objectives.

The squadron also engaged in psychological warfare missions, dropping propaganda leaflets behind enemy lines. It took part in the Allied operations against Axis forces in North Africa during March–May 1943, the reduction of Pantelleria and Lampedusain islands during June.

It was also involved in the invasion of Sicily in July, the landing at Salerno on the Italian mainland in September, the Allied advance toward Rome during January–June 1944, the invasion of Southern France in August 1944 and the Allied operations in northern Italy from September 1944 to April 1945. It was inactivated in Italy after the German capitulation in September 1945.

It was reactivated as part of the Air Force Reserve in 1947 and equipped with A-26/B-26 Invader medium bombers, the unit was then inactivated in 1949 due to budget cuts.

Strategic Air Command
The squadron was reactivated in 1953 as a Strategic Air Command (SAC) B-47 Stratojet squadron. It trained in aerial refueling and strategic bombardment operations with the B-47. The squadron began transferring its B-47s to other SAC wings and became non-operational as part of that aircraft's phaseout in 1961.

Intercontinental Ballistic Missile Squadron
On 1 November 1963 the 446th Strategic Missile Squadron was organized as a SAC LGM-30F Minuteman II intercontinental ballistic missile wing.  Activated on 1 Jul 1965, it was made operational on 7 December 1966, with a complement of 50 missiles. It participated in "Project Long Life II," a unique reliability test in which modified Minuteman missiles were fueled to travel a few hundred yards. The first launch from a silo occurred on 19 October 1966 and was declared unsuccessful. Nine days later, a second attempt also failed. A third attempt under "Project Giant Boost" occurred in August 1968 and again proved unsuccessful.

From December 1971 to March 1973, the squadron converted to the LGM-30G Minuteman III. These missiles represented a significant technological advancement, having multiple independently targetable reentry vehicles (MIRVs). Coordinating the missile changeover required complex planning and execution.

With the restructuring of the Air Force and the disestablishment of Strategic Air Command in the early 1990s, it was reassigned to Air Combat Command (ACC) in 1992 and then came under Air Force Space Command (AFSPC) in 1993.

In March 1995, the Base Realignment and Closure (BRAC) Commission selected the 321st Strategic Missile Wing for inactivation. The squadron was ordered to securely transfer its alert responsibilities to the 341st Missile Wing at Malmstrom Air Force Base, Montana. It maintained nuclear alert until inactivated in 1998, nearly 40 years after it first went on alert.

Lineage
 Constituted as the 446th Bombardment Squadron (Medium) on 19 June 1942
 Activated on 26 June 1942
 Redesignated 446th Bombardment Squadron, Medium on 6 March 1944
 Inactivated on 12 September 1945
 Redesignated 446th Bombardment Squadron, Light on 26 May 1947
 Activated in the reserve on 29 June 1947
 Inactivated on 27 June 1949
 Redesignated 446th Bombardment Squadron, Medium on 25 November 1953
 Activated on 15 Dec ember1953
 Discontinued and inactivated on 25 October 1961
 Redesignated 446th Strategic Missile Squadron on 1 November 1963 and activated (not organized)
 Organized on 1 July 1965
 Redesignated 446th Missile Squadron on 1 September 1991
 Inactivated on 30 September 1998

Assignments
 321st Bombardment Group, 26 June 1942 – 12 September 1945
 321st Bombardment Group, 29 June 1947 – 27 June 1949
 321st Bombardment Wing, 15 December 1953 – 25 October 1961
 Strategic Air Command, 1 November 1963 (not organized)
 321st Strategic Missile Wing (later 321st Missile Wing), 1 July 1965
 321st Missile Group, 1 July 1994 – 30 September 1998

Stations

 Barksdale Field, Louisiana, 26 June 1942
 Columbia Army Air Base, South Carolina, c. 1 August 1942
 Walterboro Army Air Field, South Carolina, September 1942
 DeRidder Army Air Base, Louisiana, c. 1 December 1942 – 21 January 1943
 Ain M'lila Airfield, Algeria, 12 March 1943
 Souk-el-Arba Airfield, Tunisia, c. 1 June 1943
 Soliman Airfield, Tunisia, 8 August 1943
 Grottaglie Airfield, Italy, October 1943
 Amendola Airfield, Italy, c. 20 November 1943

 Vincenzo Airfield, Italy, 14 January 1944
 Gaudo Airfield, Italy, February 1944
 Corsica, 23 April 1944
 Falconara Airfield, Italy, 1 April 1945
 Pomigliano Airfield, Italy, c. September-12 September 1945
 Johnstown Regional Airport, Pennsylvania, 29 June 1947 – 27 June 1949
 Pinecastle Air Force Base (later McCoy Air Force Base), Florida, 15 Dec 1953 – 25 Oct 1961
 Grand Forks Air Force Base, North Dakota,  1 Jul 1965 – 30 Sep 1998

Aircraft and Missiles

 North American B-25 Mitchell, 1942–1945
 Boeing B-47E Stratojet, 1953–1961
 LGM-30F Minuteman II, 1965–1973
 LGM-30G Minuteman III, 1972–1998
446th Missile Squadron Launch Facilities
 Missile Alert Facilities (A-E flights, each controlling 10 missiles) are located as follows:
 A-00 6.7 mi SE of Wales ND,        
 B-00 6.8 mi NxNW of Osnabrock ND,  
 C-00 5.7 mi NW of Edinburg ND,     
 D-00 1.7 mi SxSW of Nekoma ND,     
 E-00 4.3 mi SxSW of Hampden ND,

See also

 List of United States Air Force missile squadrons

References

Notes
Explanatory Notes

Footnotes

Bibliography

 

 Grand Forks AFB Minuteman Missile Site Coordinates

External links

446